Hang-dong is a dong of Guro-gu in Seoul, South Korea. It is a legal dong (법정동 ) administered under its administrative dong (행정동 ), Oryu 2-dong.

See also 
Administrative divisions of South Korea

References

External links
 Guro-gu official website
 Map of Guro-gu  at the Guro-gu official website
 Chronicle of Beopjeong-dong and Haengjeong-dong  at the Guro-gu official website

Neighbourhoods of Guro District, Seoul